A.C.O.D. is a 2013 American comedy film directed by Stu Zicherman, based on a script by Zicherman and Ben Karlin, and starring Adam Scott, Amy Poehler, Jessica Alba and Jane Lynch. The title of the film is an abbreviation for Adult Children of Divorce.

Teddy Schwarzman  produced the film through his Black Bear Pictures production company. Other stars include Richard Jenkins, Mary Elizabeth Winstead and Catherine O'Hara, with Ken Howard and Clark Duke in supporting roles.

The film was released in the U.S. on October 4, 2013.

Premise
A content and successful man decides to revisit a former counselor to make sense of his brother's wedding and his parents' extremely messy divorce. When he realizes his life has been personified in a book about children of divorce written by his mediocre counselor, he decides to confront his family about their dysfunctional nature.

Cast
 Adam Scott as Carter Spencer
 Richard Jenkins as Hugh Spencer, Carter's father
 Catherine O'Hara as Melissa, Carter's mother
 Mary Elizabeth Winstead as Lauren Stinger, Carter's girlfriend
 Clark Duke as Trey Spencer, Carter's brother
 Jane Lynch as Dr. Lorraine Judith
 Amy Poehler as Sondra Spencer, Carter's stepmother and landlord
 Ken Howard as Gary, Carter's stepfather
 Valerie Tian as Keiko Kobayashi
 Jessica Alba as Michelle
 Adam Pally as Mark

Several cast additions were reported in Deadline Hollywood: Jenkins (December 7, 2011), Lynch (February 10), Winstead (March 1), Poehler (March 8).  On March 20, Variety reported the Howard and Duke joined the cast. Pally's addition was reported in Entertainment Weekly on March 21.

Production
Filming began on March 12, 2012 in Atlanta's Castleberry Hill area. It has done some filming at the Atlanta Botanical Garden. Scenes were also shot in Decatur at the end of the month. By early April, filming had taken place in Buckhead, near Lake Lanier.

Alba got temporary tattoos of a trio of roses on her left biceps and a bow on her tailbone for her role in the film from an Atlanta-based artist.

Reception
A.C.O.D. received mixed reviews from critics. Film review aggregator Rotten Tomatoes reports that 52% of critics gave the film a positive review based on 58 reviews, with an average score of 5.49/10. The site's consensus states: "Despite its impressive cast and some sharp observations, A.C.O.D. is neither funny enough nor poignant enough to work as a potent comedy or incisive satire." While RogerEbert.com had the same type of mixed criticism for the film, the site also roundly praised the performances of Poehler, Lynch, and O'Hara, stating that the film featured "three major comic actresses working at their best level here." Furthermore, the site commended Zicherman's writing and directing, stating that "[h]is first film is a model of what a modern film comedy might be." Manohla Dargis of the New York Times Movie Review, however, criticized the film as "clichéd" and "sluggish even at 87 minutes."

On Metacritic, which assigns a rating out of 100 based on reviews from critics, the film has a score of 50 based on 23 reviews, considered to be "mixed or average reviews".

References

External links
 
 
 A.C.O.D. at The New York Times
 
 
 
 

2013 films
2013 comedy films
2010s English-language films
American comedy films
Black Bear Pictures films
Films about divorce
Films about dysfunctional families
Films shot in Atlanta
The Film Arcade films
2010s American films